Skintight is the third album by Leaves' Eyes female vocalist and lyricist Liv Kristine.  It was released in August 2010 on Napalm Records.

Track listing

Limited edition has one bonus track.

Production
Produced, recorded, engineered, mixed and mastered by Alexander Krull
Assistant recording engineers: Thorsten Bauer & Matthias Röderer
Additional Programming & Samples by Alexander Krull
Recorded at Mastersound Studio, Steinheim, Germany

Personnel
Liv Kristine: Vocals
Thorsten Bauer: Electric and acoustic guitars, bass, keyboards, mandolin 
Seven Antonopoulos: Drums and percussion
Oliver Palotei: Piano on "The Rarest Flower"
Christoph Kutzer: Cello on "The Rarest Flower"

References
Liv Kristine; Skintight CD Booklet; 2010 Napalm Records.

2010 albums
Liv Kristine albums
Napalm Records albums
Albums produced by Alexander Krull